Blastobasis taricheuta is a moth in the  family Blastobasidae. It is found in South Africa.

The length of the forewings is 9.6 mm. The forewings are brown intermixed with a few pale brown scales. The hindwings are pale brown.

References

Endemic moths of South Africa
Moths described in 1909
Blastobasis
Moths of Africa